The 1969–70 season was Newport County's eighth consecutive season in the Football League Fourth Division since relegation at the end of the 1961–62 season and their 42nd overall in the Football League. They finished in the re-election places for the second successive season, but were re-elected.

Season review

Results summary

Results by round

Fixtures and results

Fourth Division

FA Cup

League Cup

Welsh Cup

League table

Election

References

 Amber in the Blood: A History of Newport County.

External links
 Newport County 1969-1970 : Results
 Newport County football club match record: 1970
 Welsh Cup 1969/70

1969-70
English football clubs 1969–70 season
1969–70 in Welsh football